Planning Magazine is a monthly publication of the American Planning Association. The headquarters is in Chicago. It offers news and analyses of events in planning (including suburban, rural, and small town planning, environmental planning, neighborhood revitalization, economic development, social planning, and urban design).

References

External links

Business magazines published in the United States
Monthly magazines published in the United States
Design magazines
Magazines with year of establishment missing
Magazines published in Chicago
Professional and trade magazines